The Stanleigh Mine is an abandoned uranium mine located approximately 3 km northeast of Elliot Lake, Ontario, owned and operated by Rio Algom Ltd. The site has been rehabilitated and is currently undergoing environmental monitoring.

The mine was in operation from 1958 to 1961, and again from 1983 to 1996. During this time, it produced 14 million tonnes of ore

Other mines in the area
 Spanish American Mine
 Can-Met Mine
 Milliken Mine
 Panel Mine
 Denison Mine
 Stanrock Mine
 Quirke Mine(s)
 Pronto Mine
 Buckles Mine
 Lacnor Mine
 Nordic Mine

See also
Quartz-pebble conglomerate deposits
Uranium mining
List of uranium mines
List of mines in Ontario

References

External links
 
 
 
 

Uranium mines in Ontario
Mines in Elliot Lake
Underground mines in Canada
Former mines in Ontario
Rio Algom